The 2019 Pittsburgh Pirates season was the franchise's 138th season overall, 133rd season as a member of the National League, and 19th season at PNC Park. The Pirates were eliminated from postseason contention after a 14-1 loss to the Cubs on September 14, 2019. Manager Clint Hurdle was fired an hour before the start of the final game of the 2019 season. Tom Prince, the Pirates' bench coach, managed the team for the season finale.

Season standings

National League Central

National League playoff standings

Record vs. opponents

Detailed records

Game log

|-style="background:#fbb"
|1||March 28||@ Reds || 3–5 || Duke (1–0) || Taillon (0–1) || Hernandez (1) || 44,049 || 0–1 || L1
|-style="text-align:center; background:#bbb;"
|—||March 30||@ Reds || colspan="7" |PPD, RAIN; rescheduled for May 27
|-style="background:#bfb"
|2||March 31||@ Reds || 5–0 || Williams (1–0) || Gray (0–1) || — || 18,737 || 1–1 || W1
|-

|-style="background:#fbb"
|3||April 1||Cardinals || 5–6 (11) || Hicks (1–1) || Brault (0–1)  || Gant (1) || 37,336 || 1–2 || L1
|-style="background:#fbb"
|4||April 3||Cardinals || 4–5 (10) || Gant (2–0) || Burdi (0–1) || Hudson (1) || 23,954 || 1–3 || L2
|-style="background:#bfb"
|5||April 4||Reds || 2–0 || Kingham (1–0) || Hernandez (0–1) || Vázquez (1) || 8,523 || 2–3 || W1
|-style="background:#bfb"
|6||April 5||Reds || 2–0 || Musgrove (1–0) || Gray (0–2) || Vázquez (2) || 12,497 || 3–3 || W2
|-style="background:#bfb"
|7||April 6||Reds || 6–5 (10) || Liriano (1–0) || Iglesias (0–2) || — || 15,798 || 4–3 || W3
|-style="background:#bfb"
|8||April 7||Reds || 7–5 || Archer (1–0) || DeSclafani (0–1) || Rodríguez (1) || 14,750 || 5–3 || W4
|-style="background:#fbb"
|9||April 8||@ Cubs || 0–10 || Brach (1–0) || Taillon (0–2) || — || 40,692 || 5–4 || L1
|-style="background:#bfb"
|10||April 10||@ Cubs || 5–2 ||Lyles (1–0)  || Darvish (0–2)  || Vázquez (3) || 32,798 || 6–4 || W1
|-style="background:#fbb"
|11||April 11||@ Cubs || 0–2 ||Quintana (1–1)  ||Musgrove (1–1)  || Strop (1) || 31,906 || 6–5 || L1 
|-style="background:#bfb"
|12||April 12||@ Nationals || 6–3 (10) || Burdi (1–1)  || Grace (0–1) || Vázquez (4) || 27,084 || 7–5 || W1
|-style="background:#fbb"
|13||April 13||@ Nationals || 2–3 || Suero (1–0)  || Rodríguez (0–1) || Doolittle (1) || 32,103 || 7–6 || L1 
|-style="background:#bfb"
|14||April 14||@ Nationals || 4–3 || Vázquez (1–0) || Suero (1–1) || — || 22,347 || 8–6 || W1
|-style="background:#bfb"
|15||April 16||@ Tigers || 5–3 (10) || Kela (1–0) ||  Greene (0–1) || Kingham (1) || 13,251 ||9–6|| W2
|-style="background:#bfb"
|16||April 17||@ Tigers || 3–2 (10) || Burdi (2–1) || Farmer (1–1) || Vázquez (5) || 12,994 || 10–6 || W3
|-style="background:#bfb"
|17||April 19||Giants || 4–1 || Lyles (2–0) || Bumgarner (1–3) || Vázquez (6)  || 15,049 || 11–6 || W4
|-style="background:#bfb"
|18||April 20||Giants || 3–1 (5) || Taillon (1–2)  || Holland (1–3) || — || 17,663 || 12–6 || W5
|-style="background:#fbb"
|19||April 21||Giants || 2–3 || Rodríguez (3–2) || Archer (1–1) || Smith (5) || 12,396 || 12–7 || L1
|-style="background:#fbb"
|20||April 22||Diamondbacks || 4–12 || Andriese (3–1) || Crick (0–1) || — || 9,233 || 12–8 || L2
|-style="background:#fbb"
|21||April 23||Diamondbacks || 1–2 || Weaver (2–1) || Williams (1–1) || Holland (5) || 8,558 || 12–9 || L3
|-style="background:#fbb"
|22||April 24||Diamondbacks || 2–11 || Kelly (2–2) || Lyles (2–1) || — || 9,450 || 12–10 || L4
|-style="background:#fbb"
|23||April 25||Diamondbacks || 0–5 || Greinke (4–1) || Taillon (1–3) || — || 9,365 || 12–11 || L5
|-style="background:#fbb;”
|24||April 26||@ Dodgers || 2–6 || Ryu (3–1) || Archer (1–2) || — || 50,748 || 12–12 || L6
|-style="background:#fbb"
|25||April 27||@ Dodgers || 1–3 || Kershaw (1–0) || Musgrove (1–2) || Jansen (9) || 47,877 ||  12–13 || L7
|-style="background:#fbb"
|26||April 28||@ Dodgers || 6–7 || Urías (2–1)   || Rodríguez (0–2) || Jansen (10)  || 52,875 ||  12–14 || L8
|-style="background:#bfb"
|27||April 30||@ Rangers || 6–4 (11) || Crick (1–1)  || Chavez (0–1) || Vázquez (7)  || 18,641 || 13–14 || W1 
|-

|-style="background:#bfb"
|28||May 1||@ Rangers || 7–5 || Taillon (2–3)  || Miller (1–2) || Vázquez (8)  || 23,562 || 14–14 || W2 
|-style="background:#fbb"
|29||May 3||Athletics || 1–14 || Anderson (4–2) || Musgrove (1–3) || — || 16,428 || 14–15 || L1
|-style="background:#bfb"
|30||May 4||Athletics || 6–4 ||  Feliz (1–0) ||  Wendelken (0–1) || Vázquez (9) || 26,447 || 15–15 || W1
|-style="background:#bfb"
|31||May 5||Athletics || 5–3 (13) || Lyons (1–0)  || Rodney (0–2) || — || 18,517 || 16–15 || W2 
|-style="background:#bfb"
|32||May 7||Rangers || 5–4 ||  Feliz (2–0) ||  Sampson (0–2) || Vázquez (10) || 13,032 || 17–15 || W3
|-style="background:#fbb"
|33||May 8||Rangers || 6–9 || Jurado (1–1) || Lyons (1–1) || Martin (1) || 13,905 || 17–16 || L1
|-style="background:#fbb"
|34||May 9||@ Cardinals || 4–17 || Wacha (3–0) || Musgrove (1–4) || — || 38,925 || 17–17 || L2
|-style="background:#bfb"
|35||May 10||@ Cardinals || 2–1 || Williams (2–1) || Miller (1–2) ||  Vázquez (11) || 45,060 || 18–17 || W1
|-style="background:#bfb"
|36||May 11||@ Cardinals || 2–1 || Lyles (3–1) || Mikolas (4–3) || Vázquez (12) || 43,011 || 19–17 || W2
|-style="background:#bfb"
|37||May 12||@ Cardinals || 10–6 || Stratton (1–2) || Brebbia (1–2) || — || 48,555 || 20–17 || W3
|-style="background:#fbb"
|38||May 13||@ Diamondbacks || 3–9 || Ray (3–1) || Kingham (1–1) || — || 15,418 || 20–18 || L1
|-style="background:#bfb"
|39||May 14||@ Diamondbacks || 6–2 || Musgrove (2–4)  || Weaver (3–2) || — || 21,047 || 21–18 || W1
|-style="background:#fbb"
|40||May 15||@ Diamondbacks || 1–11 || Greinke (6–1) || Archer (1–3) || — || 17,258 || 21–19 || L1
|-style="background:#fbb"
|41||May 16||@ Padres || 3–4 || Warren (3–1) || Rodríguez (0–3) || Yates (17) || 20,877 || 21–20 || L2
|-style="background:#bfb"
|42||May 17||@ Padres || 5–3 || Lyles (4–1) || Lucchesi (3–3) || — || 28,913 || 22–20 || W1
|-style="background:#bfb"
|43||May 18||@ Padres || 7–2 || Brault (1–1) || Margevicius (2–5) || — || 39,856 || 23–20 || W2
|-style="background:#bfb"
|44||May 19||@ Padres || 6–4 || Musgrove (3–4) || Quantrill (0–2) || Vázquez (13) || 29,863 || 24–20 || W3
|-style="background:#fbb"
|45||May 21||Rockies || 0–5 || Márquez (5–2) || Archer (1–4) || — || 12,265 || 24–21 || L1
|-style="background:#fbb"
|46||May 22||Rockies || 3–9 || Gray (4–4) || DuRapau (0–1) || — || 9,534 || 24–22 || L2
|-style="background:#bfb"
|47||May 23||Rockies || 14–6 || Lyles (5–1) || Senzatela (3–4) || — || 15,490 || 25–22 || W1
|-style="background:#fbb"
|48||May 24||Dodgers || 2–10 || Buehler (5–1) || Feliz (2–1) || — || 32,388 || 25–23 || L1
|-style="background:#fbb"
|49||May 25||Dodgers || 2–7 || Ryu (7–1) || Musgrove (3–5) || — || 25,852 || 25–24 || L2
|-style="background:#fbb"
|50||May 26||Dodgers || 7–11 || Maeda (6–2)  || Archer (1–5) || — || 25,260 || 25–25 || L3
|-style="background:#bfb"
|51||May 27 (1)||@ Reds || 8–5 || Crick (2–1) || Hernandez (1–3) || Vázquez (14) || 20,569 || 26–25 || W1
|-style="background:#fbb"
|52||May 27 (2)||@ Reds || 1–8 || Gray (2–4) || Keller (0–1) || — || 27,489 || 26–26 || L1
|-style="background:#fbb"
|53||May 28||@ Reds || 6–11 || Sims (1–0) || Lyles (5–2) || — || 13,824 || 26–27 || L2 
|-style="background:#bfb"
|54||May 29||@ Reds || 7–2 || Brault (2–1) || DeSclafani (2–3) || — || 15,252 || 27–27 || W1
|-style="background:#fbb"
|55||May 30||Brewers || 5–11 || Anderson (3–0) || Musgrove (3–6) || — || 13,059 || 27–28 || L1
|-style="background:#bfb"
|56||May 31||Brewers || 9–4 || Archer (2–5) || Chacín (3–7) || — || 28,465 || 28–28 || W1
|-

|-style="background:#fbb
|57||June 1||Brewers || 10–12 (13) || Houser (1–1) || McRae (0–1) || — || 28,770 || 28–29 || L1
|-style="background:#fbb
|58||June 2||Brewers || 2–4 || Davies (6–0) || Lyles (5–3) || Burnes (1) || 19,442 || 28–30 || L2
|-style="background:#fbb
|59||June 4||Braves || 5–12 || Winkler (2–1) || Crick (2–2) || — || 13,963 || 28–31 || L3
|-style="background:#bfb
|60||June 5||Braves || 7–4 || Musgrove (4–6) || Gausman (2–5) || — || 13,904 || 29–31 || W1
|-style="background:#bfb
|61||June 6||Braves || 6–1 || Archer (3–5) || Foltynewicz (1–5) || Vázquez (15) || 18,232 || 30–31 || W2
|-style="background:#fbb
|62||June 7||@ Brewers || 4–10 || Woodruff (8–1) || Davis (0–1) || — || 30,296 || 30–32 || L1
|-style="background:#fbb
|63||June 8||@ Brewers || 3–5 || Davies (7–0) || Feliz (2–2) || Hader (15) || 40,704 || 30–33 || L2
|-style="background:#fbb
|64||June 9||@ Brewers || 2–5 || Jeffress (1–0) || Liriano (1–1) || Hader (16) || 45,375 || 30–34 || L3
|-style="background:#fbb
|65||June 10||@ Braves || 7–13 || Newcomb (1–0) || McRae (0–2) || Webb (2) || 21,822 || 30–35 || L4
|-style="background:#fbb
|66||June 11||@ Braves || 5–7 (8) || Toussaint (4–0) || Archer (3–6) || Swarzak (4) || 31,305 || 30–36 || L5
|-style="background:#fbb
|67||June 12||@ Braves || 7–8 (11) || Webb (4–0) || Feliz (2–3) || — || 24,428 || 30–37 || L6
|-style="background:#fbb
|68||June 13||@ Braves || 5–6 || Teherán (5–4) || Musgrove (4–7) || Jackson (10) || 35,108 || 30–38 || L7
|-style="background:#bfb
|69||June 14||@ Marlins || 11–0 || Brault (3–1) || Richards (3–7) || — || 8,340 || 31–38 || W1
|-style="background:#fbb
|70||June 15||@ Marlins || 3–4 || López (5–5) || Hartlieb (0–1) || Romo (12) || 11,464 || 31–39 || L1
|-style="background:#bfb
|71||June 16||@ Marlins || 5–4 || Rodríguez (1–3) || Anderson (2–3) || Vázquez (16) || 12,472 || 32–39 || W1
|-style="background:#fbb
|72||June 18||Tigers || 4–5 || Farmer (4–4) || Crick (2–3) || Greene (21) || 18,301 || 32–40 || L1
|-style="background:#bfb
|73||June 19||Tigers || 8–7 || Rodríguez (2–3) || Ramirez (3–2) || Vázquez (17) || 18,088 || 33–40 || W1
|-style="background:#bfb
|74||June 21||Padres || 2–1 || Musgrove (5–7) || Lauer (5–7) || Vázquez (18) || 33,437 || 34–40 || W2
|-style="background:#bfb
|75||June 22||Padres || 6–3 || Crick (3–3) || Stammen (5–4) || Vázquez (19) || 26,919 || 35–40 || W3
|-style="background:#bfb
|76||June 23||Padres || 11–10 (11) || Liriano (2–1) || Wisler (2–2) || — || 25,294 || 36–40 || W4
|-style="background:#fbb
|77||June 25||@ Astros || 1–5 || Cole (7–5) || Williams (2–2) || — || 37,193 || 36–41 || L1
|-style="background:#bfb
|78||June 26||@ Astros || 14–2 || Agrazal (1–0) || Valdez (3–4) || — || 39,312 || 37–41 || W1
|-style="background:#bfb
|79||June 27||@ Astros || 10–0 || Musgrove (6–7) || Peacock (6–6) || — || 38,943 || 38–41 || W2
|-style="background:#bfb
|80||June 28||@ Brewers || 3–2 || Vázquez (2–0) || Jeffress (1–2) || — || 33,931 || 39–41 || W3
|-style="background:#fbb
|81||June 29||@ Brewers || 1–3 || Woodruff (10–2) || Lyles (5–4) || Hader (20) || 37,821 || 39–42 || L1
|-style="background:#fbb
|82||June 30||@ Brewers || 1–2 || Jeffress (2–2) || Crick (3–4) || Albers (1) || 41,257 || 39–43 || L2
|-

|-style="background:#bfb
|83||July 1||Cubs || 18–5 || Williams (3–2) || Alzolay (1–1) || — || 17,772 || 40–43 || W1
|-style="background:#bfb
|84||July 2||Cubs || 5–1 || Holmes (1–0) || Hendricks (7–6) || — || 14,573 || 41–43 || W2
|-style="background:#bfb
|85||July 3||Cubs || 6–5 || Rodríguez (3–3) || Kimbrel (0–1) || — ||  17,831 || 42–43 || W3
|-style="background:#fbb
|86||July 4||Cubs || 3–11 || Quintana (6–7) || Lyles (5–5) || — || 29,238 || 42–44 || L1
|-style="background:#fbb
|87||July 5||Brewers || 6–7  || Guerra (3–1) || Vázquez (2–1) || — || 23,229 || 42–45 || L2
|-style="background:#bfb
|88||July 6||Brewers || 12–2 || Agrazal (2–0) || Houser (2–3) || — || 28,038 || 43–45 || W1
|-style="background:#bfb
|89||July 7||Brewers || 6–5 || Liriano (3–1) || Guerra (3–2) || Vázquez (20) || 17,624 || 44–45 || W2
|-style=background:#bbbfff 
|colspan=10|90th All-Star Game in Cleveland, OH
|-style="background:#fbb
|90||July 12||@ Cubs || 3–4 || Rosario (1–0) || Crick (3–5) || Kimbrel (3) || 40,740 || 44–46 || L1
|-style="background:#fbb
|91||July 13||@ Cubs || 4–10 || Lester (9–6) || Lyles (5–6) || — || 40,286 || 44–47 || L2
|-style="background:#fbb
|92||July 14||@ Cubs || 3–8 || Quintana (7–7) || Williams (3–3) || — || 39,291 || 44–48 || L3
|-style="background:#fbb
|93||July 15||@ Cardinals || 0–7 || Mikolas (6–9) || Musgrove (6–8) || — || 41,965 || 44–49 || L4
|-style="background:#bfb
|94||July 16||@ Cardinals || 3–1 || Liriano (4–1) || Martínez (2–1) || Vázquez (21) || 43,777 || 45–49 || W1
|-style="background:#fbb
|95||July 17||@ Cardinals || 5–6 || Brebbia (3–3)|| Liriano (4–2) || Martínez (6) || 43,186 || 45–50 || L1
|-style="background:#fbb
|96||July 19||Phillies || 1–6 || Nicasio (2–3) || Rodríguez (3–4) || Irvin (1) || 34,117 || 45–51 || L2
|-style="background:#bfb
|97||July 20||Phillies || 5–1 || Musgrove (7–8) || Eflin (7–10) || — || 38,380 || 46–51 || W1
|-style="background:#fbb
|98||July 21||Phillies || 1–2  || Suárez (3–0) || Stratton (1–3) || — || 24,830 || 46–52 || L1
|-style="background:#fbb
|99||July 22||Cardinals || 5–6  || Shreve (1–0) || Holmes (1–1) || Martínez (9) || 13,096 || 46–53 || L2
|-style="background:#fbb
|100||July 23||Cardinals || 3–4 || Hudson (10–4) || Archer (3–7) || Miller (3) || 15,778 || 46–54 || L3
|-style="background:#fbb
|101||July 24||Cardinals || 8–14 || Wainwright (7–7) || Lyles (5–7) || — ||  18,675 || 46–55 || L4
|-style="background:#fbb
|102||July 25||Cardinals || 3–6 || Mikolas (7–10) || Musgrove (7–9) || — || 24,534 || 46–56 || L5
|-style="background:#fbb
|103||July 26||@ Mets || 3–6 || Wheeler (7–6) || Agrazal (2–1) || Lugo (1) || 33,776 || 46–57 || L6
|-style="background:#fbb
|104||July 27||@ Mets || 0–3 || Matz (6–6) || Williams (3–4) || — || 39,944 || 46–58 || L7
|-style="background:#fbb
|105||July 28||@ Mets || 7–8 || Vargas (6–5) || Archer (3–8) || Díaz (23) || 32,976 || 46–59 || L8
|-style="background:#fbb
|106||July 29||@ Reds || 6–11 || Gray (6–6) || McRae (0–3) || — || 15,944 || 46–60 || L9
|-style="background:#bfb
|107||July 30||@ Reds || 11–4 || Musgrove (8–9) || Roark (6–7) || — || 18,786 || 47–60 || W1
|-style="background:#fbb
|108||July 31||@ Reds || 1–4 || Castillo (10–4) || Agrazal (2–2) || Iglesias (20) || 20,886 || 47–61 || L1
|-

|-style="background:#bfb
|109||August 2||Mets || 8–4 || Williams (4–4) || Matz (6–7) || — || 24,311 || 48–61 || W1
|-style="background:#fbb
|110||August 3||Mets || 5–7 || Wilson (3–1) || Crick (3–6) || — || 37,335 || 48–62 || L1 
|-style="background:#fbb
|111||August 4||Mets || 2–13 || Syndergaard (8–5) || Musgrove (8–10) || — || 22,716 || 48–63 || L2
|-style="background:#fbb
|112||August 5||Brewers || 7–9 || Lyles (7–7) || Agrazal (2–3) || Hader (25) || 11,208 || 48–64 || L3
|-style="background:#fbb
|113||August 6||Brewers || 3–4 || Guerra (4–3) || Liriano (4–3) || Albers (2) || 13,969 || 48–65 || L4
|-style="background:#fbb
|114||August 7||Brewers || 3–8 || Guerra (5–3) || Williams (4–5) || — || 12,885 || 48–66 || L5
|-style="background:#fbb
|115||August 9||@ Cardinals || 2–6 || Martínez (3–2) || Rodríguez (3–5) || — || 42,757 || 48–67 || L6
|-style="background:#fbb
|116||August 10||@ Cardinals || 1–3 || Wainwright (8–8) || Musgrove (8–11) || Martínez (12) || 45,026 || 48–68 || L7
|-style="background:#fbb
|117||August 11||@ Cardinals || 9–11 || Gant (8–0) || Crick (3–7) || Miller (4) || 43,912 || 48–69 || L8
|-style="background:#bfb
|118||August 12||@ Angels || 10–2 || Keller (1–1) || Suárez (2–4) || — || 33,527 || 49–69 || W1
|-style="background:#bfb
|119||August 13||@ Angels || 10–7 || Williams (5–5) || Cole (2–4) || Vázquez (22) || 33,568 || 50–69 || W2
|-style="background:#fbb
|120||August 14||@ Angels || 4–7 || Peters (3–1) || Archer (3–9) || — || 33,542 || 50–70 || L1
|-style="background:#bfb
|121||August 16||Cubs || 3–2 || Kela (2–0) || Kintzler (2–2) || — || 29,746 || 51–70 || W1
|-style="background:#fbb
|122||August 17||Cubs || 0–2 || Lester (10–8) || Brault (3–2) || Wick (1) || 28,359 || 51–71 || L1
|-style="background:#fbb
|123||August 18||Cubs || 1–7 || Quintana (11–7) || Keller (1–2) || — || 2,503 || 51–72 || L2
|-style="background:#fbb
|124||August 19||Nationals || 0–13 || Guerra (2–1) || Williams (5–6) || — || 11,284 || 51–73 || L3
|-style="background:#bfb
|125||August 20||Nationals || 4–1 || Vázquez (3–1) || Suero (3–7) || — || 10,449 || 52–73 || W1
|-style="background:#fbb
|126||August 21||Nationals || 1–11 || Corbin (10–5) || Musgrove (8–12) || — || 10,577 || 52–74 || L1
|-style="background:#fbb
|127||August 22||Nationals || 1–7 || Strickland (2–1) || Brault (3–3) || — || 10,587 || 52–75 || L2
|-style="background:#bfb
|128||August 23||Reds || 3–2 || Vázquez (4–1) || Iglesias (2–9) || — || 20,091 || 53–75 || W1
|-style="background:#bfb
|129||August 24||Reds || 14–0 || Williams (6–6) || Wood (1–3) || — || 26,776 || 54–75 || W2
|-style="background:#bfb
|130||August 25||Reds || 9–8 || Agrazal (3–3) || Bauer (10–11) || Vázquez (23) || 22,349 || 55–75 || W3
|-style="background:#fbb
|131||August 26||@ Phillies || 5–6  || Morin (1–0) || Feliz (2–4) || — || 27,932 || 55–76 || L1
|-style="background:#bfb
|132||August 27||@ Phillies || 5–4 || Vázquez (5–1) || Neris (2–5) || — || 26,200 || 56–76 || W1
|-style="background:#fbb
|133||August 28||@ Phillies || 3–12 || Velasquez (6–7) || Keller (1–3) || — || 24,224 || 56–77 || L1
|-style="background:#bfb
|134||August 29||@ Rockies || 11–8 || Williams (7–6) || Gonzalez (0–6) || Vázquez (24) || 33,408 || 57–77 || W1
|-style="background:#bfb
|135||August 30||@ Rockies || 9–4 || Agrazal (4–3) || Senzatela (8–9) || — || 27,789 || 58–77 || W2
|-style="background:#bfb
|136||August 31||@ Rockies || 11–4 || Musgrove (9–12) || Melville (1–1) || — || 37,293 || 59–77 || W3
|-

|-style="background:#bfb
|137||September 1||@ Rockies || 6–2 || Brault (4–3) || Hoffman (1–5) || — || 32,685 || 60–77 || W4
|-style="background:#fbb
|138||September 3||Marlins || 4–5  || Conley (2–7) || Markel (0–1) || Ureña (1) || 9,169 || 60–78 || L1
|-style="background:#bfb
|139||September 4||Marlins || 6–5 || Wang (2–0) || Ureña (4–8) || — || 9,043 || 61–78 || W1
|-style="background:#fbb
|140||September 5||Marlins || 7–10 || Moran (1–0) || Agrazal (4–4) || — || 9,642 || 61–79 || L1
|-style="background:#bfb
|141||September 6||Cardinals || 9–4 || Wang (3–0) || Miller (4–5) || Vázquez (25) || 19,090 || 62–79 || W1
|-style="background:#fbb
|142||September 7||Cardinals || 1–10 || Wainwright (11–9) || Brault (4–4) || — || 23,996 || 62–80 || L1
|-style="background:#fbb
|143||September 8||Cardinals || 0–2 || Flaherty (10–7) || Marvel (0–1) || Martínez (19) || 18,363 || 62–81 || L2
|-style="background:#bfb
|144||September 9||@ Giants || 6–4 || Rodríguez (4–5) || Abad (0–2) || Vázquez (26)  || 26,826 || 63–81 || W1
|-style="background:#fbb
|145||September 10||@ Giants || 4–5 || Cueto (1–0) || Keller (1–4) || Anderson (1) || 26,877 || 63–82 || L1
|-style="background:#bfb
|146||September 11||@ Giants || 6–3 || Feliz (3–4) || Webb (1–2) || Vázquez (27) || 26,627 || 64–82 || W1
|-style="background:#bfb
|147||September 12||@ Giants || 4–2 || Musgrove (10–12) || Samardzija (10–12) || Vázquez (28) || 30,918 || 65–82 || W2
|-style="background:#fbb
|148||September 13||@ Cubs || 8–17 || Lester (13–10) || Brault (4–5) || Mills (1) || 39,080 || 65–83 || L1
|-style="background:#fbb
|149||September 14||@ Cubs || 1–14 || Hendricks (11–9) || Marvel (0–2) || — || 39,928 || 65–84 || L2
|-style="background:#fbb
|150||September 15||@ Cubs || 6–16 || Wieck (1–1)|| Williams (7–7) || — || 39,103 || 65–85 || L3
|-style="background:#fbb
|151||September 17||Mariners || 0–6 || Gonzales (16–11) || Keller (1–5) || — || 10,933 || 65–86 || L4
|-style="background:#fbb
|152||September 18||Mariners || 1–4 || Milone (4–9) || Agrazal (4–5) || Magill (5) || 9,875 || 65–87 || L5
|-style="background:#fbb
|153||September 19||Mariners || 5–6  || Brennan (3–6) || Holmes (1–2) || Swanson (1) || 12,543 || 65–88 || L6
|-style="background:#fbb
|154||September 20||@ Brewers || 1–10 || Anderson (7–4) || Brault (4–6) || — || 43,390 || 65–89 || L7
|-style="background:#fbb
|155||September 21||@ Brewers || 1–10 || Suter (3–0) || Marvel (0–3) || — || 42,888 || 65–90 || L8
|-style="background:#fbb
|156||September 22||@ Brewers || 3–4 || González (3–2) || Williams (7–8) || Hader (35) || 43,321 || 65–91 || L9
|-style="background:#bfb
|157||September 24||Cubs || 9–2 || Liriano (5–3) || Hendricks (11–10) || — || 9,989 || 66–91 || W1
|-style="background:#bfb
|158||September 25||Cubs || 4–2 || Feliz (4–4) || Wieck (1–2) || Kela (1) || 10,592 || 67–91 || W2
|-style="background:#bfb
|159||September 26||Cubs || 9–5 || Musgrove (11–12) || Quintana (13–9) || — || 10,529 || 68–91 || W3
|-style="background:#bfb
|160||September 27||Reds || 6–5 || Ríos (1–0) || Iglesias (3–12) || — || 18,544 || 69–91 || W4
|-style="background:#fbb
|161||September 28||Reds || 2–4  || Alaniz (1–0) || McRae (0–4) || — || 21,084 || 69–92 || L1
|-style="background:#fbb
|162||September 29||Reds || 1–3 || Mahle (3–12) || Williams (7–9) || Lorenzen (7) || 23,617 || 69–93 || L2
|-

|- style="text-align:center;"
| Legend:       = Win       = Loss       = PostponementBold = Pirates team member

Roster

Opening Day lineup

Injured lists

7-day injured list

10-day injured list

60-day injured list

Notable achievements

Awards
National League Player of the Month
Josh Bell (May)

Farm system

References

External links
 2019 Pittsburgh Pirates at Baseball Reference
 Pittsburgh Pirates official site

Pittsburgh Pirates seasons
Pittsburgh Pirates
Pittsburgh Pirates